Daniyar Bekturuly Usenov (Daniiar Bektūrūly Üsenov; born 18 February 2001) is a Kazakhstani footballer currently playing as a midfielder for Kairat.

Career statistics

Club

Notes

References

2001 births
Living people
Kazakhstani footballers
Association football midfielders
Kazakhstan Premier League players
FC Kairat players
People from Aktau
21st-century Kazakhstani people